The Greatest Show on Earth may refer to:

Arts, entertainment, and media

Circus
 Dan Rice's circus (1830s–1860s) was first described by an Arkansas paper as the "Greatest Show on Earth"
 The tagline of Ringling Bros. and Barnum & Bailey Circus

Songs
 "The Greatest Show on Earth", a song by metal band Machinae Supremacy
 "Greatest Show on Earth", a song by Michael Jackson on the 1972 Ben album
 "The Greatest Show on Earth", a song by Suggs on the 1998 album The Three Pyramids Club
 "The Greatest Show on Earth", a song by Norwegian progressive rock band Airbag from the 2013 album The Greatest Show on Earth
 "The Greatest Show on Earth", a song by metal band Nightwish on the 2015 album Endless Forms Most Beautiful
 "Greatest Show on Earth", by Gucci Mane from the 2016 album The Return of East Atlanta Santa
 "Greatest Show on Earth", by Kid Rock from the 2017 album Sweet Southern Sugar
 The Weather Show, a segment of the Schoolhouse Rock! series, originally titled "The Greatest Show on Earth"

Other arts, entertainment, and media
 The Greatest Show on Earth (band), a British band from the early 1970s
 The Greatest Show on Earth (film) (1952), an American drama film produced and directed by Cecil B. DeMille
 The Greatest Show on Earth (TV series), a 1963 television series starring Jack Palance and based on the above film
 The Greatest Show on Earth: The Evidence for Evolution (2009), a book by British ethologist and evolutionary biologist Richard Dawkins
 The Greatest Show on Earth, a 1930s American play by George Somnes

See also 
 The Greatest Show on Turf, nickname for the 1999–2001 St. Louis Rams